Angie Lewin (born 1963) is a British printmaker working in linocut, wood engraving, lithography and screen printing.

Biography
Lewin was born in Cheshire in 1963. She studied Fine Art Printmaking at the Central School of Art and Design, London between 1983 and 1986. That was followed by a year's part-time postgraduate printmaking at Camberwell School of Arts and Crafts, and then garden design at Capel Manor College. After working in London as an illustrator, Lewin studied horticulture and moved to Norfolk to return to printmaking. She lives in Weybourne on the North Norfolk coast with her husband, Simon.

Work

Lewin is inspired by the hilltops and saltmarshes of the North Norfolk coast, and the Scottish Highlands. She depicts these contrasting environments and their native flora in wood engraving, linocut, silkscreen, lithography and collage.
Lewin states that she has been influenced by the artists Eric Ravilious and Edward Bawden.

As well as designing chickens and stationery for the company she runs with her husband Simon, Lewin has completed commissions for Penguin, Conran Octopus and Picador. She has designed fabrics for Liberty's Autumn Winter 2010 collection, including the Winter Stem design used for Liberty's 2011 Comic Relief Shopper Bag.

Lewin has exhibited widely across Britain since 1986, including at the City Art Centre, Edinburgh, and at the Willis Museum and Sainsbury Gallery, Basingstoke.

Honours and distinctions

Lewin was elected to the Royal Watercolour Society in 2016. She is a member of the Royal Society of Painter-Printmakers, The Society of Wood Engravers and The Art Workers' Guild.

References

Bibliography

External links
 
 Vintage Seekers interview
 St Jude's Prints

1963 births
Living people
Alumni of the University of the Arts London
People from North Norfolk (district)
British printmakers
British textile designers